South Point is a neighborhood in southeastern Lexington, Kentucky, United States. Its boundaries are Nicholasville Road to the west, the Jessamine County line to the south, the newer Waterford neighborhood to the east, and Waveland Museum Lane to the north.

Neighborhood statistics

 Area: 
 Population: 1,219
 Population density: 3,956 people per square mile
 Median household income (2010): $80,413

References

Neighborhoods in Lexington, Kentucky